Puck Deventer was founded as "Damesvoetbalvereniging Puck" (ladies football club Puck). The club was unusual because it only fielded women's teams. It won the national title in 1982, when it won the play-off competition between six regional champions.
In the 1980s and 1990s Puck belonged to the top in Dutch women's football. In 2000 it was dissolved and was absolved into the Koninklijke UD.

References

Defunct football clubs in the Netherlands
Association football clubs established in 1970
Association football clubs disestablished in 2000
1970 establishments in the Netherlands
2000 disestablishments in the Netherlands
Women's football clubs in the Netherlands
Football clubs in Deventer